Bob "Bobke" Roll (born July 7, 1960 in Oakland, California) is an American former professional cyclist, author, and television sports commentator. He was a member of the 7-Eleven Cycling Team until 1990 and competed for the Motorola Cycling Team in 1991. In 1992 Roll moved to Greg LeMond's Z team and added mountain biking to his racing accomplishments. Roll continued racing mountain bikes professionally through 1998. Roll is known in the cycling world, and to his global cable television fans, as "Bobke".

He has written Bobke: A Ride on the Wild Side of Cycling, Bobke II, and two Tour de France Companion volumes. ("Bobke" is Southern Dutch for "Bobby".) He has also had many columns published in VeloNews. He is credited with suggesting that Joe Parkin, professional cyclist and author, move to Europe and wrote the foreword for Joe's first book.

In 1998 a young Lance Armstrong, continuing to recover from testicular cancer remediation, had recently dropped out of the Paris–Nice cycling race.  Armstrong's training coach, Chris Carmichael, invited Roll to journey to Boone, North Carolina, to talk with Lance and do training rides with the young Armstrong for several days. Armstrong was extremely discouraged by his recent European cycling results, and Carmichael believed Armstrong had lost his career focus and was on the verge of fully retiring from professional cycling. Almost out of desperation, Carmichael talked Armstrong into doing one last series of intensive training rides, with Roll as his riding partner. 

According to Roll, "I am sure Lance had probably never met a bike racer like me...a person who could still find some joy and happiness in such weather misery. We had eight hours a day, for eight straight days, of continuous riding in the pouring rain - rain in Biblical proportions!  I think Lance would've turned things around even without our talks and rides in the Appalachia[n]s, but it turned out to be a pivotal career event for him (and Roll had made a new cycling friend)." A refocused and encouraged Armstrong went on to a successful fourth-place finish in the Vuelta a España, and within a year and a half he had won his first yellow jersey overall victory in the Tour de France road race. Armstrong has since had his yellow jersey wins nullified due to doping. (Roll's tale of the ride is in Bobke II; Armstrong's is in It's Not About the Bike.)

Roll continues to enjoy riding road and mountain bicycles for recreation, and is a member of the veteran cable television broadcasting team (along with Phil Liggett, MBE and the late Paul Sherwen) who serve as road cycling expert-commentators for the NBC Sports Network cable network's coverage of the Tour de France, Vuelta a España, Giro d'Italia, Paris–Roubaix, Tour of California, and other international cycling road races.

Roll has appeared in a series of Road ID Tour de France television commercials as himself, riding a bus along with "Tour Mania" (a costumed-disguised rowdy faux rock group played by well-known professional cyclists, such as George Hincapie).

Cycling achievements
3-time Tour de France racer - 63rd (1986), DNF due to a crash (1987), 132nd (1990).  In addition, Roll was supposed to start the 1988 Tour de France but dropped out the day before the race began due to illness.
3-time Giro d'Italia racer, including 1988 when he was a domestique for winner Andrew Hampsten.  During the stage through the snow-covered Gavia Pass, Hampsten took 2nd and the general classification leader's pink jersey, and Roll had to ride up the hill to deliver Hampsten's warm clothes.  He finished 61st.  He finished 78th in 1985 and 114th in 1989.
7-time Paris–Roubaix racer - 55th (1986), 48th (1987),  25th (1988),  37th (1989),  61st (1990),  and two DNFs
2-time Liège–Bastogne–Liège racer - 17th (1987),  and 54th (1990) 
3-time Tour de Suisse racer - 56th (1987) - as a domestique for overall winner Andrew Hampsten,  48th (1990) 
2-time Dauphiné Libéré racer - 1990,  97th (1991) - where in an odd twist he wore the number ending in 1 signifying he was Motorola's "team leader" for the event 

2-time Amstel Gold Race participant - 64th (1988),  120th (1991) 
Tour of Luxembourg racer - 40th (1987) 
Won stage 3 of the 1988 Tour de Romandie
Won stage 11 (Vail criterium) of the 1985 Coors Classic
Won the 1997 & 1998 San Francisco Hill Climb
Raced in eight World Championships (in both road racing and mountain biking)

Grand Tour general classification results timeline

Bibliography

References

External links
 Bob Roll's website
 Bob Roll's book
 A weblog/tribute to Bob with comments on current events in cycling
 Bob in his 7-Eleven uniform
 2007 Pezcyclingnews interview of Bob Roll by Matt Wood

American male cyclists
1960 births
Living people
American sports announcers
American color commentators
Cycling announcers
American mountain bikers
Sportspeople from Oakland, California
Cyclists from California